La Máquina is an American amateur football club, based out of the Santa Ana, California area, in central Orange County, competing in the United Premier Soccer League. The club takes its name and identity from Cruz Azul of Liga MX, and was formed as a branch of the Irvine Premier Soccer Club's FC Golden State, for competing in the UPSL.

U.S. Open Cup record

2016

La Máquina entered the 2016 U.S. Open Cup, in the first round against the Portland Timbers U-23 of the Premier Development League, and advanced to the second round by defeating the Timbers by a score of 2–0. La Máquina qualified to the First Round of the 2016 U.S. Open Cup by defeating 2015 Lamar Hunt U.S. Open Cup Chula Vista FC by a score of 4–0.

La Máquina defeated the Sacramento Gold of the National Premier Soccer League by a score of 2–0 in the second round of the Open Cup on May 18, 2016 at Westminster High School in Westminster, California and advanced to face fellow UPSL side LA Wolves FC in a historic face off putting two new clubs and leagues in the third round. This was the first Open Cup for both teams.

On June 1, 2016, La Máquina defeated L.A. Wolves in the third round of the U.S. Open Cup and advanced to the following round to face the LA Galaxy at the StubHub Center on June 14, 2016.

On June 14, 2016, La Máquina faced the LA Galaxy at the StubHub Center in Carson, CA and fell in extra time by a score of 4–1, after a controversial goal was allowed by the referee in favor of the Galaxy. The match commentators said that the final score was not reflective of how the match played out, given that La Máquina held the Galaxy to a 1–1 tie for 90 minutes. Although there were questionable calls in the match, La Máquina had a man advantage for about 70 minutes of regulation time, after Galaxy midfielder Rafael García was ejected from the game upon receiving a straight red card on a foul to La Máquina's midfielder Ramiro Zurdo Díaz. La Máquina were incapable of closing the game in regulation time.

2016 Qualifying

La Máquina qualified to their first U.S. Open Cup in two qualifying rounds. There were to be three elimination rounds, but the U.S. Soccer Federation used its discretion to qualify the winners of the second qualifying rounds, due to the restructuring of the tournament that took place that year.

2017

La Máquina qualified to their second consecutive U.S. Open Cup, in two qualifying rounds, by defeating Orange County FC and Santa Ana Winds FC in late 2016. However, the club would not match the deep run they made the year prior, after being eliminated in the first round by Fresno Fuego of the Premier Development League.

2017 Qualifying

2018

La Máquina qualified to their third consecutive U.S. Open Cup on November 19, 2017 by defeating Chula Vista FC of the So Cal Premier League by a score of 4–1. La Máquina defeated fellow UPSL club Bell Gardens FC in the first round and Las Vegas Mobsters in the second round by forfeit.

2018 Qualifying

Year by year

La Máquina was suspended from Spring 2016 UPSL play for being involved in a brawl with fellow league club San Nicolas FC in 2015, however, La Máquina returned to the UPSL after serving a six-game suspension.

Squad

The following players formed La Máquina's 2016 U.S. Open Cup squad:

References

External links
 

United Premier Soccer League teams
Soccer clubs in Greater Los Angeles
Sports in Santa Ana, California